Crime Limited was a BBC television series that was a spin-off from the BBC's Crimewatch. The first series aired on BBC One over ten episodes in 1992 and was presented by Nick Ross and Sue Cook. A second series ran in 1993 and a third series ran in 1994.

History
First aired on 28 April 1992, Crime Limited was the second spin-off from Crimewatch, described by producers as "a new ten-part series that takes the cameras behind the scenes of crime."

Presented by Nick Ross and Sue Cook, the series includes features and reports that Ross described as "[being unable to] form part of our appeal for information". Ross commented that, "Crime Limited gives us the chance to go into these stories. Some are exciting, some are reassuring and some are frankly funny. Some, we hope, will help to limit crime." Cook left Crime Limited after the first series, leaving Ross as the sole presenter for two further series, which aired in 1993 and 1994. The producers were Linda Cleeve and John Fothergill and it was edited by Nikki Cheetham. Its most infamous episode featured a prosecution-biased dramatization of the Florence Jackson murder case of 1992, whose outcome was later exposed as a miscarriage of justice.

Transmissions

See also
 Crimewatch

References

External links

1990s British crime television series
1992 British television series debuts
1994 British television series endings
BBC crime television shows
Limited
English-language television shows
Investigative documentary television series